Mahurkuda Village in Arjuni Morgaontahsil in Gondia district is 7 km from Arjuni. It well known for its literacy, a village with population of 3000 plus and literacy more than 70%.

References

Villages in Gondia district
Gondia district